Perfect Number (lit. Suspect X) is a 2012 South Korean mystery-drama film directed by Bang Eun-jin. Adapted from Keigo Higashino's novel The Devotion of Suspect X, it centers around a mild-mannered mathematics teacher (Ryoo Seung-bum) who plans the perfect alibi for the woman he secretly loves (Lee Yo-won) when she unexpectedly murders her abusive ex-husband. Cho Jin-woong received a Best Supporting Actor nomination at the 49th Baeksang Arts Awards in 2013.

Plot
Kim Seok-go showed a lot of promise as a brilliant mathematician when he was in school, resolutely focused on his studies rather than on friends throughout his childhood. Now in his 30s, he's an ordinary high school math teacher, a far cry from the promising future of his youth. Seok-go is solemn and introverted, and his morning exchanges with Baek Hwa-sun, the cafe employee he buys lunch from, is the brightest part of his day. When Hwa-sun's ex-husband mercilessly beats Hwa-sun and her niece, Hwa-sun kills him. Seok-go overhears the fight from his house next door and decides to cover up the killing and protect her from the police. He uses his genius in meticulously planning the perfect alibi for her, and thanks to his efforts, Hwa-sun is cleared in the case. However, the detective in charge, Jo Min-beom, believes that Hwa-sun is guilty and follows his intuition despite the lack of evidence. Min-beom also happens to have gone to the same high school as Seok-go, and when he finds out that his old school friend lives next door to the prime suspect, he starts digging deeper into Seok-go's life.

Cast
Ryoo Seung-bum as Kim Seok-go
Lee Yo-won as Baek Hwa-sun
Cho Jin-woong as Detective Jo Min-beom
Kim Yoon-sung as Sang-joon, Min-beom's colleague
Kim Bo-ra as Yoon-ah, Hwa-sun's niece
Lee Seok-joon as Nam Tae-woo
Im Sung-min as Jung-sook
Kwak Min-ho as Kim Cheol-min
Kwon Hae-hyo as police team leader
Nam Moon-cheol as police section chief
Park Hyung-soo as investigation team member 1 
Nam Yeon-woo as investigation team member 2
Lee Hwang-eui as homeless man 1
Lee Soo-hyung as homeless man 2
Kim Joo-ryung as Madam Jung
Han Do-hyun as Seok-go in high school
Kim Ah-ron as girl
Baek Seung-do as Seok-go's student
Park Jung-pyo as emergency room doctor
Myung Gye-nam as Jinsung Inn proprietor
Song Young-chang as polygraph examiner
Chae Young-in as diving master

References

External links

 
 
 

2012 films
2010s Korean-language films
Films based on Japanese novels
Films based on works by Keigo Higashino
Films directed by Bang Eun-jin
South Korean crime drama films
South Korean crime thriller films
South Korean mystery drama films
South Korean mystery thriller films
2012 crime drama films
2012 crime thriller films
Films about miscarriage of justice
2010s mystery drama films
2010s mystery thriller films
2010s South Korean films